Motuloa is an islet in the atoll of Funafuti, Tuvalu. Motu loa means long island. It lies on the southeastern rim of the atoll and is 800m long northeast–southwest, but only 50m wide. It is only about 25m southwest of Telele and can be reached by foot from it during low tide. The islet is densely vegetated.

References

External links 
Satellite Image IKONOS

Islands of Tuvalu
Pacific islands claimed under the Guano Islands Act
Funafuti